Gulbahar Bano (born 1963) is a Pakistani ghazal singer. She started her singing career in 70s and early 80s from Radio Pakistan, Bahawalpur station. Irfan Ali, station director of radio Pakistan Bahawalpur first gave her a chance on radio and then helped her move to Karachi. She moved to Karachi in 80s and moved her focus from Kafi to ghazal singing. Later she moved to Lahore.  She achieved Presidential Award for Pride of Performance in 2006.

She is currently living a very vulnerable life with her brothers family in Khanqah Sharif, Bahawalpur District.  She has lost senses since last few years and is not able to spend an ordinary life.

Popular songs
 Chahat Mein Kia Dunya Dari, Ishq mai kesi Majbori - Poet: Mohsin Bhopali
 Hamain Jahan Mey
 Kya Kya Yeh Rang
 Dhal Gaye Raat
 Phir Kahan Mumkin
 Dard Kay Saaz
 Jayen Uss Gul Ke Taraf
 Kabhi Kabhi To
 Udasiyuon Ka Saman
 Tu Paas Bhi Ho To
 Toh kya ye tey hai ke ab umar bhar naheen milna
 Saagar roye lehrien shor machayein

References

External links
 Ghazal Queen GulBhahr Bano listen on SoundCloud
 Albums of Gulbahar Bano
 Gulbahar Bano Tracks
 Gulbahar Bano
 Interview of Gulbahar Bano
 Gul Bahar Bano is a famous Pakistani ghazal singer. Listen to her Songs here
 Gulbahar Bano on Spotify
 Gulbahar Bano - Pandora Radio

1963 births
Living people
Pakistani ghazal singers
People from Bahawalpur District
 20th-century Pakistani women singers